Located in the heart of the Adirondack Mountains, North Warren Central School is in Chestertown, New York, and is the northernmost school district in Warren County. Serving Chestertown, Horicon, and Pottersville students in grades K–12; North Warren is a relatively large school district in size, but a relatively small school district in number of students. The North Warren Central School District is an independent entity, governed by an elected board of education consisting of seven members.

District
Towns and their communities in the school district.
 Town of Chester
 Chestertown
 Pottersville
 Town of Horicon
 Brant Lake
 Adirondack

Athletics 
North Warren has 12 Varsity Sports teams that compete in Class D (smallest of NYS classes) of Section 2 in the NYSPHSAA. Most teams compete in the Adirondack League along with several other Class C and D schools in the area. Historically the field hockey team has been very successful and recently cross country, soccer, baseball and boys basketball have experienced success.

Cross country 
The cross country running program is currently under the rule of Eric Bott as the varsity coach and Martin vysholid, and star runner, Robert David Hill running modified.
2006 season:
 Wasaren League Champions (Boys)
 Section 2 Champions (Boys)
 5th Place in State Championship Race (Boys)
2007 season:
 Adirondack League Champions (Boys)
 Adirondack League Championship Race Winners (Boys)
2009 season
 Adirondack League Champions (Girls)
 Adirondack League Championship Race Winners (Girls)
2010 season
Adirondack League Champions (Girls)
Adirondack League Championship Race Winners (Girls)
Section 2 Champions (Girls)
2011 season
Adirondack League Champions (Girls)
Adirondack League Championship Race Winners (Girls)
Section 2 Runner Up (Girls)

Past league all-stars

Boys
Greg Turcotte      (4 time 2003–2006)
Noah Dingman       (4 time 2004–2007)
Alec Underwood     (3 time 2008–2010)
André Wade         (1 time 2004)
John Mulligan      (1 time 2006)
Zack Smith         (1 time 2007)
Ryan Wade          (1 time 2007)
Stuart Mead        (1 time 2007)
Jeffrey Bennett    (1 time 2009)
Iain Underwood     (3 time 2010–2012)
Cody Philips       (1 time 2010)

Girls
Sarah Turcotte     (3 time 2006–2008)
Cassie Maday       (4 time 2008–2011)
Ashley Maresca     (4 time 2008–2011)
Megan Erickson     (3 time 2009–2011) (2010,2011 League Champion)
Malory Wolfe       (3 time 2009–2011)
Ellie Underwood    (1 time 2011)
Lydia Kenney       (1 time 2011)
Natasha Leuchanka  (1 time 2006)
Melissa Frederick  (1 time 2007)
Skyler Johnson     (1 time 2007)
Tori Mardis        (1 time 2009)

Past individual state qualifiers

Boys
Greg Turcotte      (2 time 2005, 2006)
Noah Dingman       (2 time 2006, 2007)

Girls
Natasha Leuchanka  (1 time 2006)
Sarah Turcotte     (1 time 2007)
Cassie Maday       (1 time 2008)
Megan Erickson     (3 time 2009–2011)

Past individual sectional champions

Girls
Megan Erickson     (2010)

Field hockey 
Head coach Sue Huck retired in 2007; her replacement is Lynn Lewis. Field hockey is no longer offered at NWCS.

Regional champions:
1981
1994
2004
Section 2 champions:
1981
1989
1994
1995
2001
2004
2005

State runner up:
1994
2004
Section 2 runner up:
1983
1984
1991
1992
1993
2002
2003

Soccer 
Chris Nelson is currently the head coach of the varsity soccer team.
2007 Adirondack League Champions
2007 Section 2 Class D Runner Up
1987 Section 2 Class D Runner Up

Past league all-stars:

John Remmington
Bruce Carpenter
Jeff Lemelson

Boys basketball 
James Cuyler is currently the head coach of the varsity basketball team.
 2000 Section 2 Class D Champions
 2001 Section 2 Class D Runner Up
 2007 Section 2 Class D Runner Up
 2020 Section 2 Class D champions

Girls basketball
P. J. Hogan is currently the head coach of the girls varsity basketball team.
1980 Section 2 Class D champion
1980 Section 2 Class D regional champions

Tennis
Chris Nelson is currently the head coach of the boys and girls tennis teams.
 2007 Section 2 Class D runner up (boys)
 2008 Section 2 Class D runner up 
(Boys)

Baseball 
Jeff Dibble is currently the head coach of the varsity baseball team.
2008 Section 2 Class D runner up

Academics
There are currently 10 Young Scholars, a program for the academically above average students. This is one of the largest in the area.

Notable graduates include Professor Udi Greenboim.

References

External links
 

Public elementary schools in New York (state)
Public middle schools in New York (state)
Public high schools in New York (state)
School districts in New York (state)
Schools in Warren County, New York
School districts established in 1974